James Steele may refer to:

 James Steele (British Army officer) (1894–1975), British general
 James Steele (sports shooter) (1884–1928), Canadian Olympic sport shooter
 James Steele (United States Army officer), US special forces veteran
 James B. Steele (born 1943), American investigative journalist and author
 James Harlan Steele (1913–2013), American veterinarian
 Jim Steele (footballer) (born 1950), Scottish footballer who also played for Southampton
 Jim Steele (wrestler) (born 1967), American professional wrestler
 Jimmy Steele (American football) (1909–1980), University of Florida football player
 Jimmy Steele (dentist) (1962–2017), British dentist
 Jimmy Steele (republican) (1907–1970), Irish republican and Irish Republican Army (IRA) member

See also
 James Steel (disambiguation)